The New Mt. Pisgah School is a historic school building in rural White County, Arkansas.  It is located northwest of Searcy, on the north side of Smith Road, east of Mt. Pisgah Road.  It is a single story stone structure, with a hip roof pierced by dormers, and long eaves with exposed rafter ends. A segmented arch projects in front of the recessed main entrance.  The school, now serving as a private residence, was built in 1938 with funding from the Works Progress Administration, and is one of the county's few surviving examples of a WPA school.

The building was listed on the National Register of Historic Places in 1992.

See also
National Register of Historic Places listings in White County, Arkansas

References

School buildings on the National Register of Historic Places in Arkansas
Works Progress Administration in Arkansas
Schools in White County, Arkansas
National Register of Historic Places in White County, Arkansas
Houses in White County, Arkansas
1938 establishments in Arkansas
School buildings completed in 1938
American Craftsman architecture in Arkansas